The Qwerty effect is the concept that modern keyboard layouts have influenced human language, naming preferences and behavior. 

The Wubi effect references the same process of influence driven by autocomplete,  Chinese input methods for computers, and real time input suggestions from search engines based on current events.

References

Computer keyboards